The Metrohrad is an extensive underground shopping mall at Bessarabska Square, Kyiv, Ukraine.

Overview
The underground mall is located in the central part of Kyiv and stretches from the Lva Tolstoho Square to the Bessarabska Square along the Velyka Vasylkivska Street. It has two levels and an area of 20,000 sq meters. It is also being used as an underpass and has exits to Lva Tolstoho metro station, Velyka Vasylkivska Street, Tarasa Shevchenka Boulevard, Bessarabsky Market and Baseina Street The mall is divided on seven quarters by function:
 New quarter
 Children goods quarter
 Service quarter
 Home goods quarter
 Central quarter
 Restaurant and entertainment quarter
 Fountains quarter

History
Metrohrad Shopping Mall was built in one year in 2001, soon after the reconstruction of Khreshchatyk. Nearby there was a construction of the similar shopping mall called Globus at Maidan Nezalezhnosti. Allegedly both of the project were approved to disrupt the anti-government protests in the center of Kyiv.

In 2017 the mall had undergone the reconstruction of several quarters, some exits were closed during the work making it harder to pass the street as there were no options other than the underpass.

During 2022 Russian invasion of Ukraine Kyiv courts began to arrest the Russian business in the city, Metrohrad had been arrested as well because one of its owners was VS Energy, the company of Russian politician Alexander Babakov who was under sanctions since 2014.

References

External links
 Official website

Shopping malls in Kyiv
Shopping malls established in 2001
Semi-subterranean structures